The Central Arkansas Bears baseball team is a varsity intercollegiate athletic team of the University of Central Arkansas (UCA) in Conway, Arkansas. The team is a member of the Atlantic Sun Conference, which is part of the National Collegiate Athletic Association's Division I, since the start of the 2022 season. The Bears, coached by Nick Harlan, play home games at Bear Stadium on the UCA campus.

History

In 2013, UCA went farther into the playoffs than any Southland conference team has been, coming within one game of winning the Starkville regional. With the exception of eventual champion UCLA in the CWS Championship Series, the Bears were the only non-SEC team to beat Mississippi State in the 2013 season, splitting 3–3 with the Bulldogs on the year. After 11 seasons as the head coach of the Bears, Allen Gum announced his retirement at the conclusion of the 2021 season. Associate Head Coach, Nick Harlan, was named his successor.

Major League Baseball
Central Arkansas has had 23 Major League Baseball Draft selections since the draft began in 1965.

See also
 List of NCAA Division I baseball programs

References

External links